Calcutta Hockey League is a field hockey league organized by Hockey Bengal (formerly the Bengal Hockey Association). The first edition was held in 1905. It is a division based league held at Kolkata and is the oldest field hockey league in India. Until the formation of the top division national leagues such as Premier Hockey League and Hockey India League post 2000s, the Calcutta Hockey League was the most competitive league in the country.

History
The league was first held in 1905, ten years after the initiation of Beighton Cup Tournament and three years before the formation of the Bengal Hockey Association (BHA) in 1908. It is considered the next prominent competition to Beighton Cup in status and eminence. The First Division commenced in 1905, and later expanded to the Second Division in 1907, Third Division in 1920, Fourth Division in 1932 and Division ll - B in 1933. The competition has been held annually ever since, except the year of partition in 1947.

The early years were dominated by the collegiate teams such as Sibpur B.E. College followed by the prominence of the Anglo-Indian club Calcutta Rangers and the Calcutta Customs throughout the 1910s and 1920s decades. The first team composed of Indian players to win the league was Greer Sporting who managed the feat in 1919. Later years and post-Independence era were dominated by the "Big Three" of Kolkata, Mohun Bagan, Mohammedan Sporting and East Bengal.

League structure 
The current league structure consists of the First Division which has two groups played across two tiers at the senior level. The Second Division and Third Division is held at U19 and U17 level. The top six teams of First Division Group A competes for Premier Hockey League while top four teams of First Division Group B competes for Super Hockey League.

Venue
The matches are held at SAI Sports Complex at Salt Lake Stadium, Mohun Bagan Ground and East Bengal Ground.

Results
The results of the Calcutta Hockey League:

See also

 Field hockey in India

References

Further reading
 (Published online: "Routledge Contemporary South Asia"; 1 July 2010).

External links
Calcutta Hockey League

Sport in Kolkata
Field hockey in West Bengal
Recurring sporting events established in 1905
Field hockey leagues in India